Sir Percy Hits Back is (chronologically) the ninth book in the Scarlet Pimpernel series by Baroness Orczy. It was first published in 1927.

A French-language version, translated and adapted by Charlotte and Marie-Louise Desroyses, was also published under the title La Vengeance du Mouron Rouge.

Plot
For young and pretty Fleurette the revolution seems far away until an aristocratic neighbouring family is threatened. The dangers become all too real, and she is accused of being a traitor. Can her father save her? Fleurette's father is Armand Chauvelin. The villainous agent is forced to ask his arch-enemy, the heroic Scarlet Pimpernel, for help.

References

External links
 
 

1927 British novels
Scarlet Pimpernel books
Novels by Baroness Emma Orczy
Hodder & Stoughton books